Procambarus clarkii, known variously as the red swamp crayfish, Louisiana crawfish or mudbug, is a species of cambarid crayfish native to freshwater bodies of northern Mexico, and southern and southeastern United States, but also introduced elsewhere (both in North America and other continents), where it is often an invasive pest.

Appearance
P. clarkii is typically dark red, with long claws and head, small or no spines on the sides of its carapace just below the head, and rows of bright red bumps on the front and side of the first leg.

Range and range expansion
The native range of P. clarkii is from northern Mexico and far southeastern New Mexico, through the Gulf States to the Florida Panhandle, as well as inland north through the Mississippi Basin to southern Illinois and Ohio. It has also been introduced, sometimes deliberately, outside its natural range to countries in Asia, Africa, Europe and elsewhere in the Americas. In northern Europe, the populations are self-maintaining but not expanding, while in southern Europe, P. clarkii is multiplying and actively colonizing new territories at the expense of the native crayfish, Astacus astacus and Austropotamobius spp.  Individuals are reported to be able to cross many miles of relatively dry ground, especially in wet seasons, although the aquarium trade and anglers may have hastened the spread in some areas (anglers using P. clarkii as fishing bait are thought to have introduced it to the state of Washington). Attempts have also been made to use P. clarkii as a biological control organism, to reduce levels of the snails involved in the lifecycle of schistosomiasis, leading to the dispersal of P. clarkii in, for instance, Kenya.

Invasiveness 
In Europe, P. clarkii is included since 2016 in the list of Invasive Alien Species of Union concern (the Union list). This implies that this species cannot be imported, bred, transported, commercialized, or intentionally released into the environment in the whole of the European Union.

Ecology

P. clarkii is most commonly found in warm freshwater bodies such as slow-flowing rivers, marshes, reservoirs, irrigation systems and rice paddies. It is considered to be the most ecologically plastic species in the order Decapoda, and is able to grow quickly even in only seasonally present water, being able to tolerate dry spells of up to four months. It is also able to tolerate slightly saline water, which is unusual for a crayfish. Additionally, P. clarkii are physiologically capable of tolerating relatively low dissolved oxygen concentrations. The average lifetime of P. clarkii is five years, although some individuals are known to have reached ages (in nature) of over six years.

The burrowing activities of P. clarkii can lead to damage to existing water courses and to crops, particularly rice, and its feeding can disrupt native ecosystems. It may outcompete the native crayfish species, and is a vector for the crayfish plague fungus Aphanomyces astaci, for crayfish virus vibriosis and for a number of parasitic worms on vertebrates.  Their burrowing activities may also be a threat to civil infrastructure such as storm ponds and levees.

In 2007, troglomorphic specimens of P. clarkii were found in caves in Portugal and Italy

Economic importance
Harvests of P. clarkii for food account for a large majority of the crayfish produced in the United States and elsewhere. Crayfish farming began in Louisiana in the 18th century, taking place in rice fields in a concurrent or alternate culture system. The concurrent polyculture of rice and crayfish combination makes good use of land, resources, equipment and infrastructure already being used for rice production.

However, crayfish production has decreased in recent years due to an increase of imports from China, which is now the world's leading producer of farmed crayfish using a rice-based system. A number of species of crustaceans were introduced to China to create markets for aquaculture and because they are better adapted to growing in a rice field than native fish species. Rice-fish farming originated in China and is once again growing as the yields from Green Revolution practices used to grow rice are no longer increasing, and resources such as land and water are becoming more limited.  Crayfish are also cultivated as animal feed for poultry farms, fish farms and bullfrog farms, or used to add into organic fertilizers.

P. clarkii has also been introduced elsewhere for cultivation, such as Spain, where its success is attributable to its ability to colonize disturbed habitats that would be unsuitable for the native crayfish (Astacus astacus). P. clarkii is also marketed by biological supply companies for teaching and research. P. clarkii also exhibits different colour morphs, including white, blue and orange, which are commonly sold in pet stores.

The introduction of P. clarkii has also resulted in economic losses in some regions. In the Baixo Mondego region of Portugal, it caused a decrease in 6.3% of profits in rice fields. However, this was on a wet-seeded field. All negative effects of crayfish can be avoided if adult crayfish are separated from the seed and seedlings.

As food

P. clarkii is eaten in China, Cambodia, Thailand, Europe, Africa, the United States, Canada, Australia, New Zealand and the Caribbean.  In the United States, crayfish are particularly popular in Louisiana, where the standard culinary terms vary between "crawfish", "crayfish", "crawdaddy" or "mudbug", and crawfish boils are popular social gatherings centered around eating the crustaceans. Louisiana crawfish are usually boiled in a large pot with heavy seasoning (salt, cayenne pepper, lemon, garlic, bay leaf, etc.) and other items such as potatoes and corn on the cob. Many differing methods are used to season the dish, and there are an equal number of opinions on which one is correct.

In 1990, Louisiana produced 90% of the crayfish in the world, and consumed 70% locally. However, as early as 2003, Asian fish farms and fisheries produced more and continued to outpace production in any other part of the world.  By 2018, P. clarkii crayfish production in the Americas represented just 4% of total global P. clarkii supply. Louisiana crayfish remain in demand for local production and consumption. In 2018, 93% of crayfish farms in the US were located in Louisiana.

Reproduction
Procambarus clarkii normally reproduces sexually, but research suggests it may also reproduce by parthenogenesis.

References

Further reading

External links

 Procambarus clarkii at Animal Diversity Web

Cambaridae
Freshwater crustaceans of North America
Fauna of the Southeastern United States
Crustaceans described in 1852
Arthropods of the Dominican Republic
Edible crustaceans